Hayrettin Demirbaş (born 26 June 1963) is a Turkish former international footballer and current coach. He spent majority of his career playing at Galatasaray.

Career
In 2010, Demirbaş made a comeback at the age of 47, after 12 years of retirement and signed for 51 Niğdespor at Turkish Regional Amateur League. He made his debut for 51 Niğdespor on 22 February 2010 when 51 Niğdespor beat Polis Meslek Yüksekokulu by 7–1.

He retired once again on 2010 March following unsuccessful 3. Lig promotion attempt of 51 Niğdespor, as club was beaten by Niğde Belediyspor on a 1–0 at playoffs.

References

External links

Footballer Profile at Turkish Football Federation
Coaching Profile at Turkish Football Federation

1963 births
Footballers from Istanbul
Turkish footballers
Turkey international footballers
Turkish football managers
Association football goalkeepers
Altay S.K. footballers
Galatasaray S.K. footballers
Zeytinburnuspor footballers
Bucaspor managers
Nazilli Belediyespor managers
Süper Lig players
Living people